The term Muslim Marathas is usually used to signify Marathi Muslims from the state of Maharashtra in North-western coast of India, who speak Marathi as a mother-tongue (first language) and follows certain customs slightly differing from the rest of Indian Muslims. According to 2001 Indian census, There were 10,270,485 Muslims in Maharashtra and constituted 10.60% of the state.

See also
 Islam in India

External links
 Marathi Muslims
 60% Muslims in Maharashtra live below poverty line

References

Islam in India by location

Social groups of Maharashtra